Comè is a town and arrondissement located in the Mono Department of Benin. The commune covers an area of 163 square kilometres and as of 2012 had a population of 33,507 people. It was home to a refugee camp for Togolese refugees until it was closed in 2006.

Comè is home to a constituent monarchy, currently led by Togbé Akati II Djidjilévo. Djidjilévo claimed the kingdom covers 57 villages, primarily those of the Watchi community.

References

Communes of Benin
Arrondissements of Benin
Populated places in the Mono Department